Odessa Filmworks is a Canadian film production company, based in Ottawa, Ontario founded by film director/producer Lee Demarbre. Odessa produced the internationally distributed feature film Jesus Christ Vampire Hunter.

Productions
 1998: Harry Knuckles (short film, trailer spoof)
 1999: Harry Knuckles and the Treasure of the Aztec Mummy
 2001: Jesus Christ Vampire Hunter (feature film)
 2002: Where's Your Bobber? (documentary)
 2003: Harry Knuckles and the Siege of the Leopard Lady (short film)
 2004: Harry Knuckles and the Pearl Necklace (feature film)
 2008: The Dead Sleep Easy (feature film, co-produced with Zed Filmworks/Zed Jamaica)
 2008: Vampiro: Angel, Devil, Hero (documentary, co-produced with Zed Filmworks/Zed Jamaica)
 2009: Smash Cut

References

External links

Slamdance Festival profile: Lee Demarbre, referencing Odessa Filmworks
Variety review: Jesus Christ Vampire Hunter

Film production companies of Canada
Privately held companies of Canada